Jacques Lunis (27 May 1923 – 2 November 2008) was a French athlete who competed mainly in the 400 metres.

He competed for a France in the 1948 Summer Olympics held in London, Great Britain in the 4 x 400 metre relay where he won the silver medal with his teammates Jean Kerebel, Francis Schewetta and Robert Chef d’Hotel.

Competition record

References

1923 births
2008 deaths
French male sprinters
Olympic silver medalists for France
Athletes (track and field) at the 1948 Summer Olympics
Olympic athletes of France
European Athletics Championships medalists
Medalists at the 1948 Summer Olympics
Olympic silver medalists in athletics (track and field)